The Copacabana Fort revolt, also known as the 18 of the Fort revolt,  was one of several movements coordinated by rebel factions of the Brazilian Army against the president of Brazil, Epitácio Pessoa, and Artur Bernardes, winner of the 1922 presidential election, on 5 July 1922. They were defeated, but the revolt marks the beginning of tenentism and the events that led to the end of the First Brazilian Republic.

In 1921, Nilo Peçanha launched himself as an opposition candidate, aligning the oligarchies of second importance states against the domination of Brazilian politics by the most powerful states of São Paulo and Minas Gerais. In October, false letters attributed to Artur Bernardes with offenses to the military stirred up the election and the military participated actively in the campaign. The manipulated electoral system ensured the situationist victory in March 1922. The opposition contested the results and over the following months a military conspiracy emerged across the country to remove Epitácio Pessoa and prevent the inauguration of Artur Bernardes. It drew great enthusiasm from tenentes (lieutenants), but few senior officers. The rebels did not have a project for society, being at first a movement of reparation, but even so they reflected dissatisfaction with the regime. In early July, the revolt met with the closure of the Military Club and the brief arrest of Hermes da Fonseca for his public opposition to the government's interference, using the Army, in the election in Pernambuco.

The conspiracy was poorly organized. The loyalists had already managed to surround Fort Copacabana on the night of July 4 and arrest the officers who would revolt the large troops at Vila Militar. The following day, Hermes da Fonseca was arrested and the Military School engaged in combat against Vila Militar for a few hours before giving up. In Niterói, the revolt did little more than capture the Telephone Company. In Mato Grosso, the rebels faced the loyalists on the border with São Paulo until July 13, when they laid down their weapons before starting the fight. Only Fort Copacabana remained in revolt, firing at military targets and engaging in an "artillery duel" with the other fortifications in Guanabara Bay, which killed several civilians. On the morning of April 6, most of the garrison left the fort, with only 28 remaining. It sustained further bombardments by the Brazilian Navy, Naval Aviation and surrounding troops, refusing to surrender. The commander left to negotiate and was arrested, leaving the fort to Antônio de Siqueira Campos and three other tenentes. In the afternoon, they left for Atlântica Avenue with the remaining soldiers to face the loyalists, being defeated on the beach by much superior forces. Out of the tenentes, only Siqueira Campos and Eduardo Gomes survived in the hospital.

The July 1922 revolts failed, but Artur Bernardes would face a new military phenomenon, tenentism, which launched ever larger and more sophisticated revolts during his tenure, most of which were spent under a state of emergency. The refusal of amnesty to the rebels of 1922 was one of the reasons for the following revolts. These also failed, but the tenentistas took part in the 1930 Revolution, which put an end to the First Republic. The greatest fame of July 1922 was the Fort Copacabana and the suicidal disposition of a small number of rebels who marched against the government's troops, an episode that acquired a mythical character. The number of 18 who participated in the final combat is famous, but the actual number was probably less.

Background

The 1922 presidential election

In 1922, Brazil was undergoing a reassessment of Brazilian nationality on the eve of the centenary of the country's independence, with the Modern Art Week as a symbolic milestone, while public finances suffered from the fall of international demand for coffee, Brazil's main export product. In the presidential election, scheduled for March 1, the government candidate to succeed Epitácio Pessoa was Artur Bernardes, president (governor) of Minas Gerais and representative of the dominant groups of his state and São Paulo. In previous disputes, the situationist candidate easily achieved the consensus of the regional oligarchies, but this time the regime showed signs of exhaustion.

Several explanations have already been proposed for this oligarchic split, such as the dispute for the vice-presidency, the challenge to the economic policy favorable to coffee, a first test of populism or a challenge to the domination of the federal system by Minas Gerais and São Paulo. Some studies show the instability of the Minas Gerais-São Paulo alliance, but there was, in any case, dissatisfaction with the political arrangement.

The Republican Reaction's proposals were reformist and peaceful. It did not intend to break with the model of the First Brazilian Republic, but only to achieve equality between the states, and its state leaders had the same profile and practices as the situationists; in his state, Nilo Peçanha also applied coronelism practices, and the Reaction sought the support of disaffected oligarchs. In the electoral game of the First Republic, based on the coronelist compromise, the Republican Reaction was at a disadvantage, as it could not use the federal public machine to distribute privileges and favors. Thus, the Reaction added to traditional methods the campaign among the urban masses, a novelty at the time, as well as the search for military support. Military officers gathered around marshal Hermes da Fonseca joined Nilo Peçanha's ticket after Fonseca failed to get a candidacy. Fonseca was president of the Military Club, former president of Brazil and "virtual head of the Army", "perceived by the military as the hierarchical superior of all".

Military discontent

The young officers left the Military School of Realengo with a level of technical preparation unprecedented in the history of the Brazilian Army. But there were tensions within the officer corps. Officials were frustrated with the scorn they received from the public. Lieutenants were discouraged by their slow career progression and their failure to join and fight in World War I. Calógeras' management and the French Mission attracted criticism, accusations of corruption and difficulties in adapting. In April 1921, the dismissal of general , chief of the Brazilian Army General Staff and an enemy of Calógeras, generated a demonstration of solidarity by more than one hundred officers, threatening to split the Army, but Ribeiro was not interested in a revolt.

Crisis of the false letters 
The rapprochement between the Republican Reaction and the military reached its peak with the publication of false letters attributed to Artur Bernardes, with insulting content to the military, in order to position them against his candidacy. There were two documents published in Correio da Manhã in October 1921 as part of the newspaper's anti-Bernardes campaign. The author of the letters called Hermes a "sergeant without composure", tapping into the resentment of Army officers for the disdain they received from the civilian elite. The Military Club examined the letters attributed to Artur Bernardes and assessed them as true. Its creators ended up confessing to the forgery, but tensions in the military environment increased. Bernardes' explanations ended up being accepted by most of the officers, with the exception of a minority of captains and lieutenants. After the Military Club's examination, uniformed and armed officers campaigned for the opposition. "The garrisons and the Military School itself were fermenting with revolt". The atmosphere at the Club was unruly and angry.

Election 
The election took place in an agitated atmosphere, and the situationists, controlling the official machine, guaranteed the victory of Artur Bernardes in March 1922. It was widely known that the ballot boxes were rigged. Unlike previous elections, the opposition contested the results and called for a Court of Honor to arbitrate the process. To maintain the pressure, it radicalized its speech and waved to an exit by arms. In April, J.J. Seabra spoke: "If this patriotic and honorable solution by the Court of Arbitration is not accepted, we will have a struggle and bloodshed". The situationists were not intimidated. In May Raul Soares replied: "If the armed classes think they have the right to make a revolution, we think it is our duty to quell it". This intransigence accelerated radicalization. The opposition press denounced the arrests and transfers of anti-Bernardes lieutenants. On June 7, Congress confirmed the results of the election. The oppositionists were removed from the commissions of the Chamber of Deputies and from the work of electoral recognition. All that remained was to appeal to the military.

Nilo Peçanha invested in military agitation only as a form of pressure and did not want a revolt, but rather a popular movement before Congress on inauguration day on 15 November. He was listed in the police inquiry following the uprising, but the charges were not substantiated. Different from what Peçanha planned, a military movement on a national scale was outlined with the goals of removing Epitácio Pessoa and preventing the inauguration of Artur Bernardes. For years, criticism of electoral fraud had paved the way for the idea of ​​a violent solution.

Profile of the rebels
The mobilization that would culminate in the armed revolt sought to purify the armed class from the interference of civil politics and repair the pride of the Army. Dissident soldiers considered politics dominated by the "low and private interests" of the situationists; for them, civilian politicians had betrayed the Republic proclaimed by the Army. They were dissatisfied with society and the Army's position, not accepting obedience without question. Rebellion came from esprit de corps, still without claims to the new forces of society, which would come in later movements. There was no revolutionary manifesto in the midst of the revolt and it was at first corporate, defending military honor against the figure of Artur Bernardes. It was, even so, the expression of a revolutionary climate and the wear and tear of the regime that was not very open to new political, economic and social demands. Participants had the identity of a moral elite capable of defeating oligarchies.

Low-ranking soldiers were high among the insurgents, but few senior officers were won over to the conspiracy. The biggest exception was Hermes da Fonseca himself, who lent his name to the movement. Fonseca had several possible motives: the offenses suffered, the desire to regain his reputation, the influence of his children and dissatisfaction with the election results. The commanders of Fort Copacabana and the garrison of Mato Grosso, who participated in the revolt, were his relatives. The rebels were mostly beneficiaries of investments in military education in the previous years, with a mixture of instructors from the "Missão Indígena" at the Realengo Military School, new graduates and junior officers with recent French training. They had strong bonds built in the Military School; a few years earlier, Siqueira Campos, Eduardo Gomes and other future revolutionaries discussed politics and the First World War in a space outside the School. The lieutenants, as the lowest sector from the officialdom, lived closer to the population's needs. They were numerous, but still needed a prestigious officer in front of them, a role played by Hermes da Fonseca.

The revolt arose only in one faction within the Army, which, as a corporation, remained loyal to the power structure. By mid-1922 the officer corps split between loyalists and revolutionaries, both of whom believed in a civic role for the Army, but the revolutionaries believed in ending regionalism and corruption. Only a minority took up arms.

Conspiracy activity

Confirmation of Bernardes' victory was met with destabilizing uprisings. There was an attempt at a rebellion on the Navy's ships. In Ceará, there was an incident between the governor and the officers. In Alagoas, the troops paraded singing a little song against the official candidate. Some young naval aviators at  planned an air attack against the presidential motorcade. It was in this climate, and after incidents like these, that the July uprising would come.

At the time of the election, there were already conspiratorial talks in Rio de Janeiro, including among Hermes da Fonseca's sons, but without the coordination of high-ranking military personnel. They intended to prevent the presidential inauguration. Some police officers and sergeants loyal to the government infiltrated the conspirators. In February, The journal Estado de S. Paulo published a circular, signed "The Army", in which there was a conspiracy to depose governors and the president and hand over power to Nilo Peçanha or a dictator. In May, Epitácio Pessoa was already discussing the conspiracy behind the scenes. He had dispersed the suspected officers far from the capital and appointed reliable replacements, but he still thought that Artur Bernardes should resign, since "he will not last 24 hours in the Catete".

After the defeat in Mato Grosso, general Clodoaldo da Fonseca declared that he hoped to count on the Army and the Military Brigade of Rio Grande do Sul, and the movement could come at the end of October. Previously, he had described a plan on a national scale to his officers, with support in São Paulo, Bahia and Minas Gerais. In Pará, officers who could have participated in the revolt had been transferred before it began, such as lieutenant Pires Camargo, from the 3rd Company of the 26th Battalion of Caçadores, who had threatened to use weapons during the electoral campaign.

Rumors about an uprising in Mato Grosso had been circulating in the press since May, and even then the conspirators were already making their connections, with an intended start in Ponta Porã. After the defeat of the revolt, the inquiry of one of the lieutenants gave June 16 as the planned start date, although there was a possibly typographical error and the date would be in July. If in June, the date would be a week after the opinion of the president of Congress, the Mato Grosso senator Antônio Azeredo, recognizing the victory of Artur Bernardes. Senate approval could be the pretext for revolt. On June 27,  reported an imminent revolutionary movement in the state.

Hermes da Fonseca's arrest

The faction in the Pernambuco government, favorable to the Republican Reaction, had defeated the opposition, including relatives of Epitácio Pessoa, in the gubernatorial election on May 27. The opposition contested the results and the state entered a climate of civil war. The president named a new commander, who brought in reinforcements from other states and used his troops on behalf of the opposition. Army soldiers killed dentist Tomás Coelho Filho, bringing national attention to the crisis. Thus, officials in Recife appealed to Hermes da Fonseca.

In the telegram, on behalf of the Military Club, Fonseca warned against the Army's deviations, recalling that it "serves to defend the people, not attack them" and "political situations pass and the Army remains". It was a call to disobey the presidential order. Jaime Pessoa resigned. Epitácio Pessoa did not let it go. As Hermes da Fonseca confirmed that the telegram was his own, the Ministry of War sent him a notice of reprimand. Offended, Hermes reiterated his statements on July 2, declaring himself capable of expressing his opinion as "head of the National Army", a position legally held by the president. As a result, he received a 24-hour arrest warrant. He was taken to the 3rd Infantry Regiment, where he was released after 17 hours, at noon on 3 July.

The arrest and closure were offensive to the dissident military and served as a trigger for the revolt. Still, these were pretexts, not causes, as the conspiracy had been developing for months. At Copacabana Fort, the bombing of the city had been planned for almost six months. Hermes da Fonseca considered the uprising premature, but after his arrest the spirits of the young officers were too high to prevent it. On the night of April 4, with the revolt taking effect, he declared to a son opposed to its beginning: “It is late for everything, my son: late to retreat, late to articulate the strength I need".

Outbreak in Rio de Janeiro

Plan of action

The idea was to revolt the 1st Infantry Regiment in Vila Militar, where the command of the 1st Infantry Division and several units was located. With the support of the Realengo Military School, the School of Infantry Sergeants, the 1st Railway Company, the Engineering Battalion, the 15th Cavalry Regiment, the 2nd Artillery Regiment and the Aviation School, it would be possible to force the adhesion of the entire Vila Militar, including the 2nd Infantry Regiment. Escorted by a picket of the 15th Cavalry Regiment, marshal Hermes da Fonseca would assume command in Cascadura, leading a vanguard to face loyalist forces of the Navy, the 3rd Infantry Battalion of the Military Police, the 1st Divisional Cavalry Regiment and the 3rd Machine Gun Company in Méier. Meanwhile, the rearguard would continue to the South Zone via Jacarepaguá, following the Pica-Pau road and Copacabana. Under the cover of the cannons of the forts of Copacabana and Santa Cruz, the two most important in Guanabara Bay, it would reach the president's headquarters in the Catete Palace.

The Ministry of War did not fear the bombing of the city by the Fort Copacabana. However, Siqueira Campos and other artillerymen calculated new tables before the movement, reducing the projection load to modify the shooting angles. Thus, the cannons could fire over the mountains, threatening the city. One of them consulted the calculations with a professor of ballistics at the Militar School, without explaining his intentions. Preparations at the Fort began in advance, digging trenches, laying out barbed wire, stocking up on a month's worth of supplies, retaining personnel in the barracks, electrifying the networks, and moving the barracks and kitchen to protected locations. Ironically, the fort was the "apple of the eye" of minister Pandiá Calógeras, who treated its officers with special consideration, including Delso Mendes da Fonseca and Antônio de Siqueira Campos.

Overly optimistic that the movement would spread throughout the army, the conspirators acted with indiscretion. Thus, the government was aware of the risk of rebellion and was already taking preventive measures, transferring and removing suspected officers, especially in Vila Militar. The conspirators also had limited organization, with poor communication after the outbreak of the revolt. Some reports attest to a less elaborate conspiracy, with members who only learned about the uprising the day before. Many of those who were vehemently in favor of action did not act at the time of the revolt.[64] Before the start, Hermes da Fonseca already had an "absolute premonition of defeat", due to the lack of articulation, delay in contacts and full knowledge of the government's action. He considered civilian allies to be inert and leakers of information. The Vila Militar officers, on the other hand, were not all committed, and almost all were out of the barracks and under control. The marshal declared to his wife before the revolt: "The government controls everything. Telephones, telegraphs, trains and roads. There is no plan. These boys are crazy. They want to raze the city". The government already predicted the revolt of the Fort Copacabana and other bodies such as the Military School.

Early loyalist reaction 

On July 4 there was a meeting of the conspirators, with representatives from all the bodies in Rio de Janeiro. The government probably had insiders. The revolutionaries realized that some of them were identified by the government through their telephone contact with Fort Copacabana. Epitácio Pessoa's daughter claimed that he even knew in advance the time set for the revolt.At night, marshal Hermes had disappeared from the Palace Hotel, heading to Vila Militar, as well as several suspicious officers, and the government already predicted the revolt of Fort Copacabana. Around 22:00, colonel , commander of the 1st Infantry Regiment, assigned a company to lieutenant colonel Álvaro Guilherme Mariante, instructing him to arrest the suspected officers when they arrived by train at Vila Militar. Thus, the uprising was made impossible. Officials in Baiuca were also arrested, with the exception of a few who managed to escape.

In the 1st Regiment of Mounted Artillery, the commander, colonel João José de Lima, gathered his officers in the casino and asked their opinions. All but two lieutenants were in favor of the revolution, and therefore were arrested, leaving the regiment with the captains and sergeants. This was repeated in many units. In the words of lieutenant João Alberto Lins de Barros, one of the prisoners in that regiment,

Lieutenant Telmo Borba, who was supposed to raise the School of Infantry Sergeants, could not fulfill his commitment, as well as lieutenant Luís Carlos Prestes, deputy commander of the 1st Railway Company, who was sick. Captain Luís Gonzaga Borges Fortes tried to damage the field radiotelegraph station, mobilizing the Pontoneiros Company of the 1st Engineering Battalion, but was defeated. The Aviation School was occupied by a loyalist battalion on the night of the 4th to the 5th, when the revolutionary pilots were testing aircraft engines. Uprising attempts at the Santa Cruz fort and the 15th Cavalry Regiment also failed.

Among them was lieutenant Eduardo Gomes, who arrived in the afternoon. At 21:00 captain José da Silva Barbosa went to the Ministry of War, where he was charged with taking command of the 1st Coastal Artillery Battery, the Fort Copacabana, to prevent the uprising. Captain Barbosa was accompanied by his superior, general Bonifácio Gomes da Costa, commander of the 1st Coastal Artillery District, and a company from the 3rd Infantry Regiment. The general and the captain entered the fort at 23:30, without escort, where soldiers were preparing trenches and barbed wire and carrying ammunition and a cart with a 190mm cannon. Captain Euclides Hermes da Fonseca, commander of the fort, suggested that the transfer be carried out the following morning, but general Bonifácio, after communicating with general Fontoura, did not accept it. The fort commander arrested the two envoys.

Captain Libânio da Cunha Matos, commander of the 3rd Infantry Regiment's company, went to the fort, where general Bonifácio ordered his company to return to the barracks. He did not give the order a literal interpretation and instead occupied . The rebels had mined the ground around the fort. While the captain was out of command, his lieutenants Álvaro Barbosa Lima and Mário Tamarindo Carpenter also went to the fort. Carpenter joined in, while Lima managed to flee.

The revolts

Rio de Janeiro

First revolutionary actions

The director of the Army's Cartridge Factory, colonel João Maria Xavier de Brito Júnior, removed the ammunition for use in the revolt from the nearby Military School of Realengo. The instructor officers armed the students. Nine cadets refused to participate, as well as some officers, being arrested as a result. At 23:50, captain Oton de Oliveira Santos, in charge of the night watch by orders of the School's director, general Eduardo Monteiro de Barros, found colonel Brito with a large number of officers and students in his house, normally closed and with the lights off at this time. Called to enter, he fired two shots in the air and ran to the general's house. Monteiro de Barros headed for the Military School, but on the way rebel patrols fired in his direction. He intended to seek reinforcements in Vila Militar, but ended up arrested.  Oton was also captured by the rebels before reaching Vila Militar.

Shortly before 1:00 in the morning, lieutenant Frederico Cristiano Buiz woke up the ranks of his company, the 7th Company of the 1st Infantry Regiment, and divided them into two platoons. One stayed in front of the barracks, while he led another to the regimental officers' casino, where their commander, captain José Barbosa Monteiro, colonel Passos and others were. With his pistol in hand and in front of his armed soldiers, he declared — "The Revolution has broken out! I am with the Revolution!" Sezefredo dos Passos, despite being unarmed, advanced against Buiz and grabbed his pistol. The other officers also confronted the platoon. Captain Monteiro was killed in the clash. Buiz missed the opportunity, allowing himself to be dominated. The officers who were not yet on the government's side were arrested. For his act of personal courage, the regimental commander was later promoted to general.

Marshal Hermes left his hotel at 23:00. He would wait for the 15th Cavalry Regiment near Vila Militar. He followed in one of three cars, being intercepted at Engenho de Dentro station by a squadron of the 1st Divisional Cavalry Regiment. After abandoning the car, they managed to reach the farm belonging to deputy Mário Hermes, near Marechal Hermes station. The picket of the 15th Cavalru Regiment came, but to arrest the marshal. General Ribeiro da Costa announced his arrest at 06:00 in the morning. He was arrested on the battleship Floriano. His presence in Vila Militar could have had a great impact.

The shots were heard throughout the city at dawn and marked the beginning of the uprising. The second shot went in the same direction, the third, to the rock at the base of Fort Vigia, alerting the population, and the fourth, to the 3rd Infantry Regiment, as a protest against the arrest of Hermes da Fonseca. There was only silence.

Defeat of the Military School

The Military School of Realengo had 638 students in arms. About a hundred of them stayed at the School to take care of those who did not join, while another five hundred, or 449, headed to Vila Militar under the leadership of colonel Brito. They were of the four branches, each under its instructional assistant. The journey began at midnight along the São Pedro de Alcântara road. The expected goal was to join the revolutionaries at Vila Militar, but it was hostile.

General  was woken up at 02:00 in the morning to take over the General Staff of the Army, to which he had been appointed a few days before. The Minister of War, as a civilian, did not command the repression of the uprising, which was the responsibility of the commander of the region. However, according to Carvalho's testimony, general Carneiro da Fontoura was "invisible", resting in his office, while confusion reigned in command, with conflicting information about the revolts. Hearing the artillery on the way, Setembrino went to Vila Militar in person, where took the lead. Most of the 1st Division remained loyal.

Loyalist reinforcements were already on the way: a squadron from the 1st Divisionary Cavalry Regiment, heading towards Realengo in reconnaissance, and, towards Méier, a detachment under general João de Deus Mena Barreto, commander of the 2nd Infantry Brigade. He had the 3rd Military Police Battalion, the 3rd Machine Gun Company, under captain , and other units, without withdrawing many troops from the seat of government. All of Central do Brasil was occupied: a battalion of caçadores at Méier station, a battalion of the 2nd Infantry Regiment at Todos os Santos, and so on. To the south of Vila Militar, a police cavalry squadron guarded the Estrada Real de Santa Cruz.

The first contact was between the Realengo cavalry picket and a patrol of the 15th Independent Cavalry Regiment. At daybreak, the Realengo infantry collided with the barracks of the 1st Engineering Battalion, at the west end of Vila Militar. The revolutionaries took up positions on the Monte Alegre hill, in the locality of Árvore Seca. From there they fought a duel with the 1st Regiment of Mounted Artillery, which had a 75mm battery near the barracks and two others on the Caixa d'Água hill. 150 men from the School of Sergeants protected the artillery in the direction of Estrada Real de Santa Cruz. The projectiles flew over the roofs of Vila Militar. Captain Mascarenhas de Morais, of the 2nd Legalist Battery, reports how the rebels' artillery hit near the officers' residences, leading some families to withdraw. General Ribeiro Costa, commander of the 1st Infantry Brigade, led the response from Vila Militar. The Assault Car Company and a section of the 1st Company of Heavy Machine Guns were in reserve.

At 10:00 in the morning the bitter fight had already lasted four hours. Vila Militar's artillery went from indirect to direct and barrage fire. At that time the loyalists started an enveloping movement. In the testimony of Colonel Xavier de Brito, a new element of loyalist infantry was seen heading towards the School to bypass it from the left flank. According to O Paiz, the maneuver was behind Monte Alegre, led by colonel Nestor Sezefredo, with the 1st Infantry Regiment, a battalion of the 2nd and a squadron of the 1st Divisional Cavalry Regiment as a flank guard. Colonel Brito assembled his General Staff. There was no chance of victory, and he needed to save the cadets' lives. In Cascadura, more loyalists were waiting. Thus, the revolutionaries asked for the white flag and returned to the School. The arrested officers and students were released. The result was one dead and several wounded, among the rebels, and two dead and five wounded, among the loyalists. After 12:00 or 14:00 a squadron of loyalist cavalry, under captain , entered at school without resistance. Later, he was replaced by a battalion from Vila Militar. Colonel Brito and the instructors and other officers were arrested.

Siege of Fort Copacabana

At dawn at Fort Copacabana, the revolutionaries, at first without information, were waiting for news of their victory. Loyalist infantry remained nearby, and colonel  was appointed commander of the attacking force. The infantry stayed in the Novo and  tunnels, and the artillery, in the mountains in the region of the tunnels in Vila Rica and Leme. The detachment was composed of a cavalry squadron (for reconnaissance and liaisons), a battalion of the 3rd Infantry Regiment and two companies, a battalion of caçadores and two batteries, one of mountain artillery and the other of howitzers. At 14:30 colonel Nepomuceno received the order to attack. The bulk of the 3rd Infantry Battalion would advance to Cantagalo hill and block the enemy, while the other forces would attack the defenders in Ipanema and Copacabana beach, trying to isolate them from the fort.

The order was to attack as soon as possible, without fail before nightfall, but the detachment could only concentrate at 19:00. At the end of the morning, the commander of the Fort used the 190 mm Krupp cannons to fire at the left wing of the Ministry of War, in order to reach the table where the arrest order for Hermes da Fonseca had been signed. The first shot landed in front of the República square, raising dust and shrapnel and causing workers and residents to flee. The second fell into the back of Light & Power company, hitting a townhouse and killing a man, a woman and two children. Minister Calógeras himself telephoned to protest the destruction. Colonel Nepomuceno had orders to cut off telephone connections and the water and electricity supply, but he did not permanently cut off communications so that the rebels would know of their defeat in the rest of the city.

Without realizing it, Calógeras had indicated the target that had been hit. The gunners realized that they had forgotten to brake the gun during firing. Correcting their mistake, they fired again and hit the Ministry of War. The cannon fired twice more, hitting the courtyard and the opposite end. Two soldiers died and one was injured. Panic gripped the building. The headquarters was transferred to the Fire Department, in the same square, and then to another headquarters in Largo do Humaitá.

Shortly before 15:00, colonel Nepomuceno, a personal friend of commander Euclides, summoned the Fort to surrender, warning of the failure of the revolt. The Fort's envoy said that they would only obey marshal Hermes da Fonseca and asked for an armistice. Colonel Nepomuceno granted it, under the reasoning of gaining time for the arrival of reinforcements, but president Epitácio Pessoa, sure of his position, did not want to negotiate. While the ceasefire was in effect, at 16:00, under his orders, the Fortress of Santa Cruz opened fire. There was a "duel of the fortresses". The rebels retaliated against legal troops in Copacabana; one of the three shots hit the Guinle family mansion. At 18:30 Fort Imbuí joined the fire against Copacabana. Through the intervention of general Bonifácio, whose wife was in Imbuí, captain Euclides Hermes spared the target, choosing the Naval Battalion. Fort Vigia also participated. Loyalists were slow; Imbuí fired late, as the boiler needed three to four hours to provide sufficient pressure. Fort São Luís was supposed to participate, but it didn't even get to shoot. At 19:00, a new emissary from the Attack Forces Detachment warned that there would be no armistice and called for the surrender of the Fort. It was a formality, as the arrival of night imposed the ceasefire.

According to Siqueira Campos, a poorly communicated withdrawal order, during the bombardment of Santa Cruz, resulted in the destruction of a French 75mm cannon used in the external defense; it was thrown into the water. For Eduardo Gomes, it was a way to prevent the cannon from falling into enemy hands. Another possible motive was to express opposition to the French Military Mission. The cannon was new and was there for testing.

Among the loyalists, the mountain artillery arrived at 20:00, and the other battery, at 21:30, positioning themselves respectively in Vila Rica and in the Leme gorge. The siege was only tightened at 23:00, with the troops reaching Serzedelo Correia square, with a patrol on the beach. In an elevated position on Toneleros street, captain Eurico Gaspar Dutra served as an observer for the artillery. A company of the 3rd Infantry Division remained at Fort Vigia, and the cavalry remained near Cantagalo Hill, guarding Leblon beach. The troops did not come closer as support from the Navy's cannons was expected.

Morning of April 6 

Inside the Fort, with the supply of electricity and water being cut out, the defenders relied on candles and brackish water distilled from the sea. On the 6th, the lieutenants wanted to spare captain Euclides Hermes, the only officer with a wife and children, sending him to negotiate his surrender, but he did not want to leave. At 4:00 am, minister Calógeras telephoned to warn the rebels of the total isolation of the fort, but gave them a guarantee of life. The commander gathered his officers and explained the situation. The rebels inside the Fort knew of the imminent bombardment by the Navy and the other fortifications. A faction led by Siqueira Campos and Eduardo Gomes wanted to resist, but another considered the revolt over. The commander gave each the option of leaving or staying. Of the more than three hundred men in the garrison, only 29 remained — five officers (Euclides, Siqueira, Eduardo Gomes, Mário Carpenter and Newton Prado), two sergeants, a corporal, sixteen privates and five civilians. The prisoners were released.

At daybreak, the battleships São Paulo and Minas Gerais and the destroyer Paraná crossed Guanabara Bay. Coordinating with the Fortress of Santa Cruz, São Paulo went on to the attack against Fort Copacabana, taking care not to reach Leblon. With its three 305mm turrets, it fired 19 shots at the Fort from a distance of 6km, making several breaches. Colonel Nepomuceno's shore batteries also opened fire. São Paulo made a mistake, anchoring near Cotunduba and offering a fixed target within range of the Fort's 305mm guns, which could penetrate its armor. But when trying to use the dome, the revolutionaries discovered that it had been sabotaged by someone in the retreat. That left two 190mm guns and one 75mm gun. According to journalist Hélio Silva, the command tower of São Paulo was hit by a 190mm round and the Navy retreated to a safe distance. The inquiry would later result in the removal of the ship's captain. In his testimony, captain Euclides Hermes only stated that “we received, inert, as mere spectators" the naval bombardment. With the 190mm cannon, they fired at São Paulo's conning tower, and the Navy retreated to a safe distance. According to the Navy, the Fort fired first, the battleship responded and then silenced its batteries due to the threat of the revolutionaries bombing the city or the white flag hoisted at the Fort after the bombing.

The revolutionaries proceeded to bomb the city, targeting Ilha das Cobras, the Army headquarters, Fort Vigia and the Catete Palace. As they did not find the tables with the calculations, the shot against Catete crisscrossed, destroying a nearby house. Upon learning of the damage caused by the Fort's cannons to the civilian population, captain Euclides stopped the shots. The Minister of War asked for a new ceasefire, which he agreed to, warning, however, that he still had 72 tons of ammunition and would respond to any provocation. Around 10:00 am two emissaries of the minister went to talk with the rebels, but simultaneously two Breguet 14 planes from the Navy, which was not informed of the agreement, bombed the Fort, resulting in a fight with the emissaries. Calógeras proposed a personal conversation with Euclides Hermes, but this could be a trap. Siqueira Campos defined the conditions for the rebels, who wanted free passage abroad. The captain left the Fort, being arrested in his house.

March on Atlântica Avenue
Command of the fort was left to Siqueira Campos, and the plan was to bombard the city if the captain did not return within two hours. At 12:30, general , head of the Casa Militar, telephoned to threaten the execution of Euclides Hermes if the Fort fired again. Siqueira Campos managed to speak with Euclides by telephone, being informed that the Ministers of War and Navy guaranteed the life of the rebels if they left the Fort and surrendered unconditionally. Siqueira put the handset on the hook and did not answer. The white flag remained flying over the Fort.

Siqueira Campos proposed bombing the city and then blowing up the Fort in a collective suicide. Eduardo Gomes contested: the bombings would kill more civilians, and the Fort belonged to Brazil. The soldiers agreed. It was then decided to abandon the Fort. Their names were inscribed on the wall with nails. The flag of Brazil was cut into 28 or 29 pieces, one for each member. They distributed some brandy, filled their pockets with ammunition, and left armed with Mauser 1908 rifles and Parabellum pistols. There would be no surrender: the way out was to fight the government supporters. They were "volunteers of death".

They left the Fort in the early afternoon. By then, surrender was expected in Catete. Upon being informed by the ministers, Epitácio Pessoa ordered an attack by the Navy and the land forces and dispatched Catete's own police guard to reinforce Copacabana. Not all 28 left the Fort, and others scattered along the way. Passersby followed as spectators. They followed Atlântica Avenue towards Túnel Novo and from there to the presidential palace. Octavio Correia, a civilian and engineer from Rio Grande do Sul, joined the combatants, receiving Newton Prado's carbine. Meanwhile, four soldiers fled. Correia already knew the commander of the Fort and the lieutenants before the Revolt. At the time, Atlântica Avenue was already duplicated and several buildings were under construction. The elitization of the shore was beginning, and the beach was frequented by various social classes. The revolutionaries stopped at Hotel Londres to drink water, where photographer Zenóbio Couto took the famous photographs. Siqueira Campos was left out. Two more defections followed. From afar, members of the 3rd Infantry Regiment shouted for them to surrender.

The nearby loyalist commander, captain Pedro Chrysol Fernandes Brasil, commanded the 6th Company of the 3rd Infantry Regiment and had three platoons in Serzedelo Correia Square under lieutenants João Francisco Sauwen,  and Pedro Miquelena. Upon learning of the rebels' departure, he left lieutenant Segadas Viana at Barroso Street (now Siqueira Campos Street), Miquelena at Hilário de Gouveia Street and Sauwen at the square. He acted under the orders of colonel Nepomuceno, but he lived a drama, as his son was among the rebels arrested at the Military School.

Final battle 

When lieutenant Segadas Viana approached the beach with his platoon to spot the rebels, he found them on the corner of Atlântica Avenue. A tense conversation ensued, pistols in hand, between him, Mário Carpenter (his colleague in the 3rd Infantry Regiment) and Siqueira Campos. Viana wanted them to surrender, and they wanted him to join. Captain Brasil also approached. Carpenter, his subordinate, declared: “captain, we didn't come to surrender, we want to die fighting, against you. It is useless, therefore, to advise us.” One of the rebels shouted: “We are going to Catete, captain”. He insisted that it was madness, as they would have to face the entire regiment, and asked them to surrender, guaranteeing his life, but they threatened him personally. So he gave the order to fire and the fighting began.

The first to die was a rebel soldier shot between Barroso Street and Hilário de Gouveia Street. The rebels divided into two groups and fired at the platoons of lieutenants Viana and Miquelena; Miquelena's platoon, suffering casualties, retreated to Serzedelo Correia square, linking up with Sauwen's. The platoon at the rear moved ahead in reinforcement. The avenue was under construction, and the rebels found shelter in the gap between the sand and the sidewalk. The government supporters, in turn, also climbed trees and roofs to shoot. With their rifles and machine guns, "It seemed to rain in the sea given the constant spray”. The rebels, on the other hand, saved ammunition. The 9th Company of the 3rd Infantry Regiment, led by captain Floriano Gomes da Cruz, went to the rear of the rebels. Captain Brasil called for reinforcements and ammunition.

One by one the rebels were shot. Captain Brasil had orders to finish them off with a bayonet charge, but he ignored it, hoping his enemies would cease fire and survive. The job fell to colonel Tertuliano Potiguara, with about 100 men from the Military Police and the 3rd Infantry Regiment, coming from the presidential guard. “The charge was given, and the last elements of the Copacabana garrison were broken”. In the end, Potiguara's men cried out: “Lift up the living! Let the living rise!” The dead and wounded were collected on the beach. The 3rd Infantry Regiment company proceeded to Fort Copacabana, where they arrested, without resistance, eight soldiers and about 15 civilians.

Casualties in Copacabana 

The number of those rescued may have exceeded 80, including a team from Brasília Filmes that tried to film the revolt; the driver was killed in the shootout and the operator and bookkeeper were wounded. Epitácio Pessoa visited the revolutionaries in the hospital. Among the government supporters, colonel Potiguara reported six deaths, with several more injured, before the bayonet charge. In this charge, a sergeant was killed by Siqueira Campos, who was shot while stabbing his liver with his bayonet. Historian Glauco Carneiro quantified 33 government supporters dead or wounded. Gazeta de Notícias reported 14 rebels dead, in addition to 5 wounded. Among the loyalists, still with uncertainty, there might have been 10 dead and 4 wounded. Correio da Manhã reported 30 wounded, between both forces, 13 privates, an "inferior" (probably a sergeant) and Mário Carpenter; at this point Newton Prado had not yet died. Another source gives 6 dead and 20 wounded among legal forces in Copacabana.

The number of rebels in combat was given as 18 (3 officers and 15 soldiers) the following morning by Gazeta de Notícias. The newspaper was the first to use this number, which became mythical, being soon exalted in verse and prose. In  words, "in a cold and rigorous calculation, that number that history has kept as a symbol, is not reached." There were several desertions along the way, and not all of them were recorded. The testimonies contradict each other.

Eduardo Gomes remembered that Siqueira Campos identified 10 fighters, and personally mentioned four officers and about 20 enlisted men. Newton Prado reported two officers and 14 soldiers, omitting Carpenter and Eduardo Gomes, which would add up to 18. Captain Pedro Brasil gives a much higher estimate of approximately 60 rebels. The photograph, which excludes Siqueira Campos, depicts the other three officers, Otávio Correira and two soldiers in the foreground, with five or six indistinct figures behind.

From the 28 who remained in the fort, plus Octavio Correia, Hélio Silva listed ten, nine military and one civilian, in the shooting, including two unknown soldiers, one black and one white. A soldier and a civilian accompanied the march but disbanded, being arrested far from the combat site. The two strangers died. Siqueira Campos, Eduardo Gomes, Otávio Correia, Mário Carpenter, Nilton Prado and José Pinto de Oliveira were taken to the hospital wounded, where only the first two survived. Two soldiers (Hildebrando da Silva Nunes and Manoel Antônio dos Reis) "were discharged from the hospital, sued and arrested, but they did not last long". 

This enumeration includes the black soldier Pedro Ferreira de Melo, present in the photograph, as absent from the lists of dead, wounded and arrested, but he was the first of those killed. Another soldier included in this category by Hélio Silva, Manoel Antonio dos Santos, testified to O Cruzeiro magazine 42 years later, declaring that he had fought on the beach alongside ten other men. Then he allegedly escaped from the beach and was arrested the next day.

Niterói

On the other side of Guanabara Bay, on the night of the 4th to the 5th, the movement was led by the commander of the Navy, Álvaro de Vasconcelos. With the support of state police chief César Sampaio Leite and a group of revolutionary civilians, including deputy , they occupied federal and state offices including the Telephone Company, preventing communication with Rio de Janeiro. The movement was quelled after the Rio de Janeiro police chief imposed his authority on the local police chief.

Mato Grosso 

In Mato Grosso, general Joaquim Ignacio, commander of the 1st Military Circumscription, took part in the conspiracies against the government in Campo Grande, for which reason he was dismissed on March 30. The military in that state participated in several other revolts and coronelist conflicts in the first decades of the Brazilian Republic. The new commander, Clodoaldo da Fonseca, was a relative of Hermes da Fonseca. When he took office, on July 5, he found an already revolutionary environment. At night, meeting with his officers, he reported the revolution and claimed that it had the support of the majority of the Army. They decided to rise up and issue a proclamation. Clodoaldo's leadership was symbolic, as the initiative actually rested with the lieutenants. Mato Grosso officers were unaware of the revolt's failure in Rio de Janeiro, as the telegraph and railway lines were interrupted. Clodoaldo was already aware of this, but he went ahead with the revolt for fear of a rebellion by his commanders or because of the commitment he had made before his departure to Mato Grosso.

The revolutionaries followed pre-planning, occupying public buildings and calling up reservists. In Corumbá, the military quartermaster's office was broken into to provide weapons and uniforms for the conscripts, but the effort to form another battalion of caçadores was unsuccessful. Revolutionary authorities promised peace and maintenance of state civil servants, but in several places they overthrew civil authorities and looted tax collection and money-issuing bodies. Civil support was limited, existing among supporters of the Republican Reaction. In Porto Murtinho it was stronger, but martial law was applied.

To the north, in Cuiabá, the state government of  remained loyal to Epitácio Pessoa. In the 16th Battalion of Caçadores, headquartered in the city, the commander delayed the orders of the Minister of War to hand over his battalion to the state command, but he was replaced and the battalion was outside the authority of Clodoaldo da Fonseca. The 10th Independent Cavalry Regiment (RCI), from Bela Vista, also did not participate. He was divided and his commander was against the movement. The Minister of War praised the loyalty of the employees of the Postal and Telegraph Company and of the Northwest Brazil Railroad. They emptied the railroad's water tanks to slow down the journey and passed on the telegraph communications to the loyalists, who were able to decipher the revolutionary plan.

The 1st Military Circumscription constituted the Provisional Liberating Division, organized into two brigades, receiving units from Campo Grande, Porto Murtinho and Ponta Porã. The main one was the 17th Battalion of Caçadores, under the interim command of lieutenant Joaquim Távora. The plan was to concentrate forces in Três Lagoas, cross the Paraná River, enter São Paulo through Araçatuba and face the forces from São Paulo and allies in support of the lieutenants in Rio de Janeiro. The first train only left Campo Grande on July 8th. Upon arriving at Três Lagoas, they discovered that railway officials had removed the ferry from trains and other ships, leaving them on the other side and without essential parts. Even so, the revolutionaries seized a barge for 25 to 30 men, built another and captured a launch.

On July 10, colonel Tertuliano Potiguara was tasked with crushing the uprising. The President of the Republic dismissed Clodoaldo da Fonseca on the 12th. A squadron of three planes did the reconnaissance. The Public Force contingent included 255 soldiers and 21 officers from its 2nd Infantry Battalion reinforcing colonel Potiguara, while the 4th Battalion, with 617 men, remained in reserve in Bauru. The legal forces concentrated near Três Lagoas, on the São Paulo side. A veteran of World War I, colonel Potiguara prepared to cross the Paraná River under the cover of his artillery and machine guns.

The fight never took place. On June 13, general Alberto Cardoso de Aguiar conferred with Clodoaldo da Fonseca at the Três Lagoas railway station, convincing him to surrender unconditionally to avoid bloodshed. Some of the most extreme revolutionaries still wanted to fight, but Clodoaldo gave up command and was arrested. The new commander, general Cardoso de Aguiar, returned the units to their headquarters. Mato Grosso reservists, with the exception of those in the 16th Battalion of Caçadores, were disbanded.

Political consequences

On July 5, with the explosions hundreds of meters away, Congress accepted the request for a state of siege sent by president Epitácio Pessoa. The lieutenant revolt affronted the entire political class. Some Rio de Janeiro state deputies were detained. Anarchist and  workers' leaders were also persecuted. The state of siege was extended until the end of the year, already entering the next mandate. Newspapers sympathetic to the revolutionaries were censored.

Artur Bernardes assumed office as president in November with his authority shaken and contested and tried to consolidate his position. In his inaugural speech he made it clear that he would not accept changing the system from the outside in and promised not to act with rancor, but soon after he destroyed his opponents in the Republican Reaction. His focus was to pacify Pernambuco and dominate the dissident states (Bahia, Rio de Janeiro and Rio Grande do Sul). Continued political tension led to the expansion of the government's repressive capacity. The mandate of Artur Bernardes was authoritarian, with a state of siege in force for the most part and great demand for the activity of the political police.

When he took office, the Republican Reaction was already diluted and the dissident oligarchies were looking for peace with the situation. In Rio de Janeiro, the results of the election for governor, in July 1922, and for the Legislative Assembly, in December, had been disputed between the supporters of Nilo Peçanha and the opposition, leading to the formation of two Assemblies. The conflict served as a pretext for federal intervention in the state in 1923. The oppositionist  was elected without resistance in a new election. In Bahia, a conciliation candidate, was elected in December 1923 and his inauguration was guaranteed by the state of siege and federal military presence. In Rio Grande do Sul, the  broke out against the government of Borges de Medeiros. Artur Bernardes increased his authority by mediating the Pedras Altas Pact, in which the governor would not be entitled to re-election.

Nilo Peçanha, despite being opposed to the military uprising, renounced his parliamentary immunity in order to be able to answer for what had happened, thus gaining the sympathy of public opinion. He assumed the legal defense of the rebels, remaining, in the view of the tenentistas, as the civilian leader of a hypothetical provisional government until his death in 1924. Borges de Medeiros also condemned the revolt.

The revolt in 1922 was just the inauguration of a phase of military insurrections that would last until 1930. The government did not pacify the barracks. Lieutenant revolts would continue in 1924, 1925 and 1926, such as the 1924 São Paulo Revolt and the Prestes Column, but none of them managed to remove the president. Tenentism became one of the foci of opposition to the political environment of the First Brazilian Republic. In 1924, the lieutenants became more politically aware, and their own identity emerged. Tenentism represented middle-class concerns against the coffee oligarchies and their allies, advocating for a moralization of politics imposed from the top down, with a strong central government, contrary to regionalism and corruption.

Former enemies of the lieutenants, including Epitácio Pessoa and Artur Bernardes, joined them in this alliance. In the campaign, the opposition resorted to mass events. Both sides practiced fraud in the election, resulting in the situationist victory. The opposition did not accept the results, leading to the deposition of president Washington Luís in the Revolution of 1930 and the end of the First Republic.

Trial of those involved

The officers involved in Mato Grosso were sent to São Paulo from July to September to respond to inquiries, but some managed to escape to Bolivia and Paraguay. The students of the Military School of Realengo remained there, due to the large number, and an investigation was opened. They signed lists about their participation in the uprising. 588 confessed to their conscious participation, 4 said they were compelled by colleagues and officials and 18 said they were forced to participate by others. 584 students were dismissed from the School. In 1923 it looked almost empty. Instructing officers were also punished. The "Missão Indígena" came to an end, with the Minister of War lamenting the retreat of the discipline implemented by it. Even the commander of the School was exonerated, because, despite having been against the revolt, he was accused by the criminal prosecutor of not having responded with energy. The French Mission began to guide the training of students. The 588 students who rebelled were not reinstated.

At the end of Epitácio Pessoa's term, at least 118 officers and enlisted men remained in prison. The trial process was rigorous and arbitrary. Some were released for lack of evidence or proof of innocence, and others were granted habeas corpus to respond in freedom. The leaders of the revolt were transferred between numerous prisons over the next few years. This had facilitated the disposition of the rebels in 1922. Epitácio Pessoa and Setembrino de Carvalho (appointed by Artur Bernardes to the Ministry of War) advised amnesty for the new president.

Instead, in December 1923 the first sentence was the conviction under Article 107 of the Brazilian Criminal Code, of the violent attempt to overthrow the Constitution and the form of government. As the prison sentence exceeded two years, they could not be reinstated in the Army. The hope of the revolutionaries had been article 111 (coercion to the free exercise of constituted authority), with a lesser penalty. While they were tried by civilian courts, military courts arrested them for desertion. The change in tradition was logical, as amnesties ended up subverting discipline, but applied at that time, it only increased tensions, stimulating the 1924 revolts. Among those expelled from the Army and convicted, a group emerged in solidarity with each other and engaged in the conspiracy.

Soon after the 1930 Revolution, president Getúlio Vargas granted amnesty to all revolutionary lieutenants. They were reinstated in the Army and many occupied prominent positions in politics of the following decades.

Legacy 

The suicidal outcome of the revolt in Copacabana, and not the "uprising inspired by an indecisive Hermes da Fonseca”, became mythical, generating martyrs and an image of heroism that fed the idealism of the following movements. The myth generated was more important than the actual weight of the revolt. Sociologically it can be interpreted in terms of honor, romanticism, and virility. The lieutenants were young, idealistic, frustrated by not having fought in the First World War and attracted to the idea of sacrifice for the fatherland.

The date of July 5 acquired symbolic value. The conspirators of the 1924 São Paulo Revolt had chosen several earlier start dates, going back to March 28, but had repeatedly changed them due to unforeseen circumstances. Under increasing pressure from the authorities, in late June they chose the anniversary of the 1922 uprising as the starting date. In the deposition of Washington Luís in 1930, he was imprisoned in Fort Copacabana. The responsible generals did not clarify in their memoirs whether the symbolism and irony were deliberate.

In the 1964 coup d'état, the Coast Artillery HQ, next to the Fort, was taken over by a group of 21 officers. The press erroneously reported the “taking of the Fort”, which had joined on its own before the event and did not participate in the attack. The magazine O Cruzeiro called the attackers  “the 40 of the fort”.

In 1927, with the Prestes Column still in operation, deputy Maurício de Lacerda proposed a bronze monument to the "18 of the Fort”, but the Chamber of Deputies did not accept it. At the time, Army authorities considered Siqueira Campos to be a criminal. He died in 1930. The other surviving lieutenant from Copacabana Beach, Eduardo Gomes, had a long and distinguished career, becoming presidential candidate in 1945; at the time, his participation in 1922 was seen as a point of prestige. The "18" received several tributes. In 1931, Barroso Street was renamed in honor of Siqueira Campos. In 1968, Newton Prado was buried in a monumental tomb in his hometown of Leme, after receiving honors. The revolt was reenacted in 1976, and the Army currently celebrates the memory of both revolutionaries and loyalists such as Setembrino de Carvalho and Tertuliano Potiguara. Fort Copacabana is no longer used for defense purposes, but is integrated into the Army Historical Museum, which favors the preservation of the memory of the event. In Palmas, Tocantins, a monument with sculptures of "the 18" was inaugurated in 2001.

The Copacabana Fort revolt is depicted in a highly sympathetic way in an early chapter of The Knight of Hope, Jorge Amado's 1942 biography of Luís Carlos Prestes.

Notes

References

Citations

Bibliography
Books
 
 
 
 
 
 
 
 
 
 
 
 
 

Articles and academic works
 
 
 
 
 
 
 
 
 
 
 
 
 
 
 
 
 
 
 
 
 
 
 
 

Other

External links

First Brazilian Republic
Military history of Brazil
Copacabana Fort revolt
Copacabana Fort revolt
Copacabana Fort revolt
Copacabana Fort revolt
Copacabana Fort revolt